Yahorlyk Kut is a peninsula in Southern Ukraine that separates Yahorlyk Bay from the Gulf of Tendra. Administratively the peninsula is part of Skadovsk Raion.

From 1959 to 1994 it was used by the Soviet Air Force as a bombing range.

References

External links
 Echoes of the Ancient Borysthenes. "Naddnipryanska Pravda plyus" at the Kherson Arts portal. 1 November 2013

Geography of Kherson Oblast
Peninsulas of Ukraine